John Clarke (1829 – 29 February 1872) was an Australian cricketer. He played three first-class matches for New South Wales between 1859/60 and 1862/63.

See also
 List of New South Wales representative cricketers

References

External links
 

1829 births
1872 deaths
Australian cricketers
New South Wales cricketers
Place of birth missing